The World War I-era Georgian Legion was formed in 1915 by Count Friedrich Werner von der Schulenburg, a former German vice-consul in Tiflis, who then served as a German liaison officer with the Ottoman 3rd Army. He was supported by the German Empire-based Committee of Independent Georgia. The reinforcements were raised largely from refugees from the Muslim Georgian areas and Lazistan, as well as from Prisoners of War.

Approximately 1500 soldiers strong, the Legion was first commanded by Lieutenant Horst Schliephack. The highest-ranking Georgian officer of the Legion was Leo Kereselidze. The actual number of soldiers heavily fluctuated, but never exceeded 2000.

The Georgian Legion joined the German Caucasus Expedition. During the Russo-Turkish campaign of 1916–7, the Georgian Legion was stationed in the mountains east of Tirebolu, on the banks of the Harşit River not far from the Black Sea coast. The Legion was originally intended to promote a revolt in Russian-held Georgia, and remained under German control, while the Ottomans sought to use it as a normal unit within their army.

Late in 1915, the Order of Queen Tamar was introduced for issue to the soldiers and officers of the Georgian Legion.

In the end it took very little part in the fighting, being stationed on the Black Sea coast at Giresun until disbanded in January 1917, after the relations between the German-backed Georgian Committee and the Ottoman government had become strained. The former Georgian volunteer officers later joined the National Army of the Democratic Republic of Georgia in 1918. The Georgian Legion further acted as one of many components directed to destabilise Russian imperial rule in general and was a part of Germany's comprehensive approach on subversive foreign policy.

References 

Military history of Georgia (country)
Military units and formations of Georgia (country)
Military units and formations of Germany in World War I
Military units and formations established in 1915